Risse is a surname. Notable people with the surname include:

Guenter B. Risse (born 1932), American medical historian
Marcel Risse (born 1989), German footballer
Thomas Risse (born 1955), German international relations scholar
Walther Risse (1892–1965), German general
Walter Risse (1893–1969), German footballer 
German-language surnames